The Mutineers is a 1949 American adventure film starring Adele Jergens, George Reeves and Jon Hall.

The film was also known as Pirate Ship.

It was one of several movies Jon Hall made for Sam Katzman, the others including The Prince of Thieves'''.

Plot
Sailor Nick Shaw investigates the murder of a ship's captain.

Cast
Jon Hall as Nick Shaw
Adele Jergens as Norma Harrison
George Reeves as Thomas Nagle
Noel Cravat as Dudley
Don Harvey as Joe Miles
Matt Willis as Toby Jarmin
Tom Kennedy as Butch
Pat Gleason as Rogers
Frank Jacquet as Captain Stanton
Lyle Talbot as Captain Jim Duncan

Production
Filming started 27 October 1948. George Reeves, who just made Jungle Jim'' for Katzman, co-starred.

References

External links

 

1949 adventure films
1949 films
Columbia Pictures films
American adventure films
Seafaring films
American black-and-white films
Films directed by Jean Yarbrough
1940s American films